Mozu (styled MOZU) is a Japanese police television drama series. It premiered in April 2014. A film adaptation based on the series, Gekijōban Mozu, was released on November 7, 2015.

Cast
Hidetoshi Nishijima
Teruyuki Kagawa
Yoko Maki

References

2014 Japanese television series debuts
Japanese drama television series
TBS Television (Japan) dramas
Wowow original programming
Television shows based on Japanese novels